Air Chief Marshal Kaleem Saadat (Urdu:کلیم سعادت رنا; b. 12 December 1951) , is a retired four-star air officer in the Pakistan Air Force who served as the Chief of Air Staff, tenured in this capacity from 18 March 2003 until retiring from his commission on 20 March 2006.

His appointment into this command level came after the air crash that killed ACM Mushaf Ali Mir, the air chief, along with several other high-ranking Air Force officers on 19 February 2003. 
He is the President of the Centre for Aerospace and Security Studies (CASS).

Biographical overview
Kaleem Saadat was born in Lyallpur (now Faisalabad), Punjab in Pakistan into a Punjabi-speaking Rajput family on 12 December 1951. He was educated at the Air Force Public School in Sargodha, and secured his matriculation  with a class of 14th entry (697 – Fury House) in 1969. He entered in the Air Force Academy in Risalpur and passed out with the class of 51st GD(P) course, along with Rashid Minhas.

Saadat has qualified Basic Weapons Course, Turkey; Flying Instructors' Course from Risalpur; Staff College and Air War Course from PAF Air War College; L'ESGI and CSI from the École Militaire in France; and National Defence Course from the National Defence College, Islamabad.

Kaleem Saadat Rana was born in a Rajput family of Faisalabad

His foreign tours include: Exchange Pilot in Turkey (1977–78); Deputation to Algeria (1980–83); War Course at the École Militaire, Paris, France (1989–90). He was a course-mate and close friend of Rashid Minhas, the trainee pilot who crashed his aircraft and lost his life, to prevent his flight instructor from defecting to India in that aircraft, in 1971.

Command and Staff assignments
During his Air Force career, Saadat commanded No. 14 OCU Squadron, No. 32 Wing at PAF Base Masroor, and PAF Base Peshawar.

His staff and instructional appointments include assistant commandant of the College of Flying Training at PAF Academy, director of plans at AHQ, chief instructor at the National Defence College, Islamabad, and deputy chief of air staff (operations) at AHQ.

PAF Air Chief

Death of then Air Chief Mushaf Ali Mir
On 20 February 2003, the then PAF Chief Air Chief Marshal Mushaf Ali Mir died in a plane crash when the Fokker he along with his wife and fifteen other high-ranking officers were flying in crashed near Kohat in northwestern Pakistan, killing all the passengers on board. Thereafter, the then vice chief Air Marshal Syed Qaiser Hussain was made the acting Air Chief of PAF. On 19 March 2003, Air Marshal Kaleem Saadat, then deputy chief of air staff (personnel), was chosen over Hussain and Air Marshal Sarfraz Arshad Toor, air officer commanding, Air Defence Command (ADC), as the new chief of Pakistan Air Force.

Achievements
The JF-17 Thunder program under Kaleem Saadat was throttled into full gear. It was during this time, the aircraft prototype was unveiled and it flew some hours, with the semi-production being started in 2005. The Air Headquarters were shifted to its permanent location in Islamabad after having stayed in Karachi, Peshawar and Rawalpindi. The PAF achieved its best Flight Safety record of its history when in the Year 2004, it had the lowest major aircraft accident rate. The PAF had the largest ever flying operations Exercise Highmark 2005 after nearly ten years' gap as well as holding its first ever tri-service wargame titled Tempest-I.

Saadat is a recipient of Tamgha-e-Imtiaz (Military), Sitara-e-Imtiaz (Military), Hilal-e-Imtiaz (Military) and Nishan-e-Imtiaz (Military). In addition, he was decorated with French Légion d'honneur (Legion of Honour) on 13 July 2005 for the "excellent cooperation existing between French defence industries related to aeronautics and the Pakistan Air Force, which happens to maintain the most important fleet of Mirages in the world, after France, and acknowledges the impulse given personally by the Chief of Air Staff."

Retirement
In March 2006, ACM Kaleem Saadat's three-year term expired and he was replaced by the then vice chief of air staff Air Marshal Tanvir Mahmood Ahmed as the air chief.

Centre for Aerospace and Security Studies

In 2019, ACM Kaleem Saadat became the first president of the Centre for Aerospace and Security Studies (CASS), which is an independent research think tank founded by the Pakistan Air Force with specializations in the domains of aerospace, aviation, security, doctrine, and economics. CASS was inaugurated by Air Chief Marshall Mujahid Anwar Khan in July 2019.

Awards and decorations

Foreign Decorations

References

External links 
 PAF s' Chief of Air Staffs

 

Chiefs of Air Staff, Pakistan
Pakistan Air Force air marshals
Pakistan Air Force officers
Pakistani aviators
1951 births
Living people
Punjabi people
National Defence University, Pakistan alumni
Academic staff of the National Defence University, Pakistan
Pakistani military personnel of the Indo-Pakistani War of 1971
People from Faisalabad
PAF College Sargodha alumni
Pilots of the Indo-Pakistani War of 1971